Goshen Land Company Bridge is a historic Pratt through truss bridge spanning the Calfpasture River near Goshen, in Rockbridge County, Virginia, United States.

The bridge was listed on the National Register of Historic Places in 1978.

See also
List of bridges documented by the Historic American Engineering Record in Virginia
List of bridges on the National Register of Historic Places in Virginia

References

External links

Historic American Engineering Record in Virginia
Road bridges on the National Register of Historic Places in Virginia
Bridges completed in 1890
Buildings and structures in Rockbridge County, Virginia
National Register of Historic Places in Rockbridge County, Virginia
Pratt truss bridges in the United States